KJHB-LP (104.3 FM, "The Bronc") is a low-power FM radio station broadcasting an album-oriented rock music format. Licensed to Jackson, Wyoming, United States, the station is currently owned by Teton County School District #1.

References

External links
 

JHB-LP
JHB-LP
Teton County, Wyoming
Radio stations established in 2002
2002 establishments in Wyoming
Album-oriented rock radio stations in the United States
High school radio stations in the United States